Kleidocerys virescens is a species of seed bug in the family Lygaeidae. It is found in the Caribbean Sea, Central America, and North America.

References

Further reading

 

Lygaeidae
Articles created by Qbugbot
Insects described in 1794